Zarouchleika or Zarouchlaiika, official name Glafkos, is a big suburb with approximately population of 50,000 residents, it's in the southern part of the city of Patras, Greece. It is about 3 km south from the city centre. The main streets of Zarouchleika are the coastal road Akti Dymaion and Antheias Street. The OSE's railway from Patras to Pyrgos passes west of Zarouchleika.

History

The first inhabitants of the area were families that came from Zarouchla near Akrata, hence the name. It became an independent community in 1912. It was renamed to Glafkos (after the river Glafkos) in 1928 and in 1961 it became part of the metropolitan city of Patras.

Neighborhoods in Patras